Clan Grierson is a Lowlands Scottish Clan.

History

Origins of the Family

The personal name Gregor comes from the Greek for vigilant, through its Latin translation of gregorious. The name was popular amongst clergy in the Middle Ages. It is from this forename that the surname of Grierson has been claimed to be derived. It has been conjectured that the Grierson family come from the same stock as the Clan Gregor however there is no evidence to support such a claim.

The surname Grierson is a modern spelling of the medieval (circa 1408) surname Grerson. Gilbert Grierson is claimed to have been a hereditary Bailie in the Barony of Tybrys, an alternative English name being a Gerefa and in some references this is also claimed to be the origin of the surname Geresoune.

In about 1408 the Griersons acquired the lands of Lag, which became the principal seat of the clan chiefs. Gilbert Grierson is described in a charter dating from 1420 as armour bearer to the Earl of Douglas. Gilbert married Janet, daughter of Sir Simon Glendinning, whose mother was Mary Douglas, daughter of the fourth Earl of Douglas and Princess Margaret. These royal connections secured the early fortunes of the Griersons. In 1460 Vedast Grierson built a strong tower at Lag.

15th and 16th century conflicts
Vedast Grierson's son, Roger, obtained a royal charter confirming his lands in 1473. However Roger was later killed at the Battle of Sauchieburn in 1488. The Grierson Lairds of Lag also followed James IV of Scotland to the Battle of Flodden in 1513 where they met the same fate as the king.

During the wars surrounding Mary, Queen of Scots the Griersons declared for James VI of Scotland in the confrontation between the Queen and the Protestant lords.

Chief Sir William Grierson, 9th Feudal Lord of Lag (d 1629) was allied to the powerful Clan Maxwell and joined forces with them against the Clan Johnstone at the Battle of Dryfe Sands in 1593.

17th and 18th centuries
Sir William Grierson, 9th Feudal Lord of Lag was knighted by James VI in 1608. His son was Chief Sir Robert Grierson (b. 1598) who was succeeded by his cousin, another Robert Grierson. This Robert Grierson (b. 1657) was created the first Baronet of Lag. This same Robert Grierson for a time made the name of Grierson synonymous with terror and death throughout the south and west of Scotland, with his persecution of the Covenanters during the reign of James VII of Scotland. He was created a Baronet of Nova Scotia in March 1685. In that same year he surprised an illegal Covenanter service at Kirkconnel and in the ensuing struggle most of the worshipers were killed and Grierson of Lag refused to give them a decent burial which earned him his feared reputation. Amongst the Covenanter martys was John Bell of Whiteside. Bell's stepfather was the Viscount Kenmure who was with John Graham of Claverhouse when they encountered Sir Robert Grierson and a quarrel broke out. Kenmure drew his sword but Claverhouse dissuaded him from fighting a duel.

Kenmore made an alliance with the Douglas Duke of Queensberry by marrying the Duke's sister, Lady Henrietta Douglas and not surprisingly the Griersons did not support the Glorious Revolution, considering William of Orange and his wife Mary to be usurpers. In 1689 Sir Robert Grierson was arrested and held in prison until a substantial cash surety was paid. He was later imprisoned on two more occasions, including for being accused of counterfeiting money but was cleared of all the allegations. He died on 29 December 1733 at Rockhall Tower, but secured immortality in Sir Walter Scott's novel Redgauntlet. He was succeeded by his son, Sir William Grierson, 2nd Baronet who died in 1760 with no legitimate heir, and was in turn succeeded by his younger brother, James' son, Sir Robert Grierson who died in 1765 and who in return was succeeded by his uncle, the youngest son of the 1st Baronet, Sir Gilbert Grierson. His son was another Sir Robert Grierson, 5th Baronet of Lag, born 1738, died 1839 who was a close friend of Sir Walter Scott.

19th and 20th centuries
One of Sir Robert Grierson's sons was Lieut.-Col. William Grierson of Bardannoch, whose only son was Thomas Beattie Grierson, a soldier who distinguished himself at the Siege of Delhi in 1857 but died of wounds and exhaustion received there. Sir Alexander Grierson, 8th Baronet of Lag was commissioned into the 78th Ross-shire Highlanders regiment.

During World War I, Sir Robert Grierson, 10th Baronet of Lag served in the King's Own Scottish Borderers, however by this time most of the Grierson lands had been lost, although the ruins of Lag Tower still stand today.

Sir George Abraham Grierson was a distinguished linguist who devoted much of his life to the study of dialects from the Indian sub-continent.  He sold his share of the patent as King's Printer to Ireland.  He married Lucy Elizabeth Jean Collis and died in 1941. John Grierson is widely regarded as the father of the British documentary film movement.

Chief of the Name
The current Chief of the Name and Arms of Grierson is Madam Sarah Anne Grierson of Lag, the 25th hereditary Chief in an unbroken line and the first female to hold this role.

The undifferenced arms of the Grierson Chief are described as: Gules on a fess Or between three fetterlocks Argent a mullet Azure.

The crest is blazoned as 'a fetterlock Argent' placed upon a wreath of the livery colours and accompanied by the Latin motto: Hoc Securior which may be translated as "Safer by This". The Chief's crest encircled by a strap and buckle, bearing the motto, form the crest badge of the Griersons.

See also
 Grierson (name)
 Grayson (name)
 Grierson Baronets, of Lag
 Sir Robert Grierson, 1st Baronet (Auld Lagg)
 Sir William Grierson, 2nd Baronet
 Brigadier General Benjamin Grierson
 Dumfriesshire, Scotland
 Clan MacGregor
 Grierson's Raid

References

External links
 Video and narration on Lag Tower and the Griersons

Grierson
Scottish Lowlands